The 1969 Amstel Gold Race was the fourth edition of the annual road bicycle race "Amstel Gold Race", held on Sunday April 18, 1969, in the Dutch provinces of North Brabant and Limburg. The race stretched 259 kilometres, with the start in Helmond and the finish in Meerssen. There were a total of 132 competitors, and 36 cyclists finished the race.

Result

External links
Results

Amstel Gold Race
1969 in road cycling
1969 in Dutch sport